Whittaker Memorial Cemetery is a cemetery near Kildare, Texas. It was added to the Texas Historical Commission in 1996. The cemetery was once portion of a plantation worked by slaves and those buried are African American. The plantation was owned by Willis Whitaker who separated six acres for slave burials. There are more than 350 people buried at the site and it is still used today.

References

Protected areas of Cass County, Texas
Cemeteries in Texas